"Buzzin'" is a song by American hip hop artist Mann. Written by Mann, The Jackie Boyz and J.R. Rotem and produced by the latter, the song was released as a single on October 25, 2010 and serves as the lead single from Mann's debut album Mann's World. "Buzzin'" is an R&B hip hop song and is built on samples of Nu Shooz' 1986 recording "I Can't Wait", written by John Smith. The official remix of the song, featuring rapper 50 Cent, was released as a single on December 21, 2010.

Music video
The music video (directed by Jessy Terrero) was released to YouTube on December 23, 2010. with cameo appearances from Nipsey Hussle

Chart performance
The song marked Mann's first appearance on the Billboard Hot 100 when it debuted at number 95 on the week ending 29 January 2011, and peaked at #61. The song debuted at #112 on the UK Singles Chart on the week ending March 12, 2011, and peaked at #6.

References 

2010 singles
50 Cent songs
Music videos directed by Jessy Terrero
Song recordings produced by J. R. Rotem
Songs written by J. R. Rotem
Songs written by 50 Cent
Songs written by Carlos Battey
Songs written by Steven Battey
2010 songs